Indiana Jones and the Seven Veils is the third of 12 Indiana Jones novels published by Bantam Books. Rob MacGregor, the author of this book, also wrote five of the other Indiana Jones books for Bantam. Published on November 1, 1991, it is preceded by Indiana Jones and the Dance of the Giants and followed by Indiana Jones and the Genesis Deluge.

Plot summary
After barely escaping with his life from an archaeological dig in Tikal, Guatemala, Dr. Henry Jones Jr. makes his way back to New York. There he learns of the recent discovery of the mysterious writings of a missing British explorer, Colonel Percy Fawcett. Though Colonel Fawcett himself still remains missing, his rediscovered work tells a story that could drastically change history and challenge several firmly held scientific beliefs. Within those pages, an incredible picture begins to take shape of a long lost city in the jungles of Brazil and the apparently true legend of a red-headed race, possibly descended from ancient Celtic Druids. Fascinated by such a prospect, and with the lovely Deidre Campbell at his side, Indiana Jones sets out for the Amazon. However, as usual, getting there will prove to be the true adventure. And if he does manage to survive the journey, who can tell what dangers await within the mythical city itself.

Characters 
 Dr. Henry Jones Jr. / Indiana Jones
 Deirdre Campbell
 Marcus Brody
 Victor Bernard
 Percy Fawcett
 Larry Fletcher
 Brenda Hilliard
 Amergin
 Merlin
 Rae-La

See also

Indiana Jones (Prequels) - Bantam Books

External links
Indiana Jones Official website

1991 American novels
American adventure novels
Indiana Jones books
Novels set in Brazil